Linie  (formerly ) is a village in the administrative district of Gmina Bielice, within Pyrzyce County, West Pomeranian Voivodeship, in north-western Poland.

The village has a population of 510.

See also
History of Pomerania

References

Linie